Golbazar is a municipality in Siraha District in the Madhesh Province of south-eastern Nepal. Golbazar Municipality was formed by merging former VDCs of Asanpur, Jamadaha, Ashokpur Balkawa, Betauna, Durgapur, Lalpur, Muksar, Chandraudyapur, and Chandralalpur under a new local administrative structure implemented by the Government of Nepal. As per the 2011 Nepal census it had a population of 47763 people living in 2500 individual households.

Golbazar Municipality covers an area of 104.5 km². There are 13 wards under Golbazar Municipality. The office of Golbazar Municipality lies in Golbazar (Main Market).

References

External links
 UN map of the municipalities of  Siraha District
 Madhesh Province

Populated places in Siraha District
Nepal municipalities established in 2014
Municipalities in Madhesh Province